Maha is a 2022 Indian Tamil-language crime thriller film written and directed by U.R.Jameel and produced by Mathi Azhagan under the production company Etcetera Entertainment. The film stars Hansika Motwani in her 50th film, with Srikanth, Manasvi Kottachi, Sujith Shankar, Thambi Ramaiah and Karunakaran in prominent roles along with Silambarasan played an extended cameo appearance. This film is edited by John Abraham JR and the music is composed by M. Ghibran. 

The film was announced on 2019, and released on 22 July 2022 with three years delay and postponed for many times. The film opened mixed to negative reviews from critics and audience and hence, turn out to be a box office failure.

Plot
The film begins with Maha complaining to her boyfriend, Malik about some men harassing her. Those men pull up in front of them causing Malik to fight them. The scene then switches to a man who sits in front of girl who is unconscious in a room full of blood. The police then find the 8 year old's corpse in front of a building. Another girl is kidnapped and murdered, her corpse is found. Maha has a daughter, Aishu who she sends to school. A doctor suggests to ACP Vikram the killer to be a possible doctor as he has erased all semen from the girl's body after raping her multiple times.  Alex Pandian, a constable is assisting ACP Vikram with the case. 

While Aishu is returning home, the school bus stops due to repairs. The bus conductor walks with Aishu to drop her home, but halfway through he has to go back so Aishu walks the rest of the way  by herself.  Maha realises Aishu isn't home and asks at the school about Aishu. When Maha reaches the bus conductor and driver's home, they have absconded. Aishu has been kidnapped and held by the killer. Maha complains to ACP Vikram about her missing daughter. While the killer distracts Maha by calling her to go somewhere, he enters her house to delete CCTV footage. Maha receives a phone call telling her to bring cash to a building.  

One month later, Alex Pandian's grand daughter goes missing. Alex Pandian's daughter goes to a building with cash, only for the killer to take the money and attempt to escape. Vikram catches the killer and opens his mask to reveal Alex Pandian's face. The scene cuts back to Maha standing at the top of the building looking down and smiling. The movie shows Maha's flashback where Malik and her are in love. Malik is a pilot who leaves for his job when Maha finds out she is pregnant. Maha waiting eagerly to tell Malik the happy news, finds out the plane Malik was flying went missing in the Arabian Sea. The scene then flashes back to Maha grieving over her daughter's death.  

Maha inquires the police about her daughter's case but they chase her off. Maha decides to find her answers by herself and bribes a policeman to give her all the case details. Through this, Maha realises the CCTV footage taken from her house does not match with the one she has. ACP Vikram inquires Alex Pandian who reveals, one day when ACP Vikram was investigating Maha's case, he found his son's car on the road and found Aishu in the trunk. He calls Maha to tell her to go the building and takes Aishu with him and leaves Aishu in the building. Aishu not fully awake, walks over the edge and falls to her death. Alex, not wanting his son to get caught, did this. Maha listens to the recordings when the killer spoke to her again and again. In the background of the recordings, she hears a mosque and train. Maha goes into Matthew's shop, the killer, to ask about train tracks nearby not realising Alex Pandian's granddaughter is inside. As Maha leaves she hears the sound she heard on the recording and the train passing by. She finds out Aishu's phone has been turned on and realises Matthew is the killer. Matthew and Maha fight where Maha is extremely injured but succeeds in beating him and eventually kills him. ACP Vikram arrives with police force.

Cast

Production 
This is Hansika Motwani's 50th film and Mohamaad Ghibran's 25th film as composer. Sanam Shetty, Srikanth, Karunakaran and Thambi Ramaiah were chosen for important roles in the film.
Filming was scheduled to take place in late January 2020.

Music

The music of the film was composed by Ghibran. The entire soundtrack album was released on 12 July 2022. The lyrics for the songs are written by Viveka, Madhan Karky and Soundara Rajan.
 Kedutthutiye - Benny Dayal
 Hey Edhiriye (Happy Version) - Deepthi Suresh
 Hey Edhiriye (Sad Version) - Srisha

Release

Theatrical 
The film was released by theatrically worldwide on 22 July 2022, after so many delays and postponements.

Home Media 
The post-theatrical streaming rights of the film were acquired by Aha, and will be streamed on 5 August 2022.

Reception
Logesh Balachandran of Times of India gave 1.5 out of 5 and wrote "In short, Maha is not as effective as it wants to be." S. Subhakeertana of OTT Play rated the film 1 out of 5, stating that "The ending of the film might frustrate the viewer as it offers no catharsis. The story equally leaves you untouched because it does not care to rise above stereotypes." Dinamalar rated the film 1.5 out of 5.

References

External links 

2020s Tamil-language films
2022 crime thriller films
2022 films
Films scored by Mohamaad Ghibran
Indian crime thriller films